Waldsiedlung (German for "Forest settlement") was the secure housing zone for the leaders of the German Democratic Republic in Bernau bei Berlin, Brandenburg from 1960 to 1989.

Security was provided by soldiers of the Felix Dzerzhinsky Guards Regiment.

Nowadays, the community is treated by Germans as a symbol of the elite in the SED party when it ruled East Germany.

History

The German Democratic Republic (GDR) was established in 1949 as a communist state from the Soviet Zone of Occupation. The GDR was de facto ruled by the Socialist Unity Party of Germany (SED), whose leadership lived in mansions on the upscale Majakowskiring in the Pankow district of East Berlin. After the events of the Hungarian Revolution of 1956, the SED party leadership decided to build themselves a secure residential zone in a more remote location than their mansions on the Majakowskiring. 

The housing complex was constructed through an agency subordinate to the Ministry for State Security (Stasi) and was completed in 1960. Waldsiedlung was occupied by senior politicians and their families under the protection of the Stasi's bodyguard department, and relocating residences there became mandatory for all Politburo members.

Waldsiedlung was colloquially called Wandlitz among East Germans after the nearby village. In the 1980s, Waldsiedlung became known by the tongue-in-cheek nickname "Volvograd" in reference to the Soviet city of Volgograd and that the GDR's political elite began to use Volvo cars from Sweden rather than the traditional luxury Soviet Chaikas.

The site had a club house (de) with a cinema and a restaurant, a shop where a limited selection of luxury Western goods could be purchased with East German marks and were subsidized, a market garden, a health centre, a shooting range, a swimming pool, a sports field, and tennis courts. There were also barracks and social building for site employees and guards. During the Honecker-era, the cooks at Waldsiedlung were required to produce gourmet-level meals and in addition to high-quality East German food products, western products such as Beaujolais wines and seltzer water were imported from West Berlin. In 1983, a nuclear bunker with a capacity to accommodate 400 people was completed in Waldsiedlung.

In late 1989, Waldsiedlung's inhabitants had to leave the settlement in accordance with a resolution adopted by the GDR government under Premier Hans Modrow. After German reunification, Waldsiedlung became home to a rehabilitation clinic and private residences, and was brought under the administration of Bernau bei Berlin on 1 July 2001.

As of 2021, tours to Waldsiedlung are allowed for anyone who wants to look around the area.

Layout
The  outer-ring consisted of a wire mesh fence on which there were signs indicating a "wildlife research area". There was an inner-ring in the area, surrounded by a two-metre high, green security wall and could only be entered with special passes. The four entrance gates were guarded by members of the Felix Dzerzhinsky Guards Regiment, the paramilitary wing of the Stasi, and troops were stationed at 31 watchtowers within the 5-km outer fence.

In the 1970s, a four-lane autobahn connected Waldsiedlung directly to East Berlin.

References

Geography of East Germany
Buildings and structures in Brandenburg
Politics of East Germany